Siebe Schets (born 7 January 1998) is a Dutch football player. He plays for VV Goes.

Club career
He made his Eerste Divisie debut for Go Ahead Eagles on 13 April 2018 in a game against FC Eindhoven, as a 69th-minute substitute for Aaron Nemane.

References

External links
 

1998 births
Sportspeople from Vlissingen
Living people
Dutch footballers
Association football forwards
Feyenoord players
FC Twente players
Go Ahead Eagles players
FC Dordrecht players
Kozakken Boys players
Tweede Divisie players
Eerste Divisie players
Derde Divisie players
Footballers from Zeeland
VV Goes players
Jong FC Twente players